Memoria descriptiva sobre Tucumán is an Argentine 1834 book of Juan Bautista Alberdi. It was a work requested by Alejandro Heredia, governor of the Tucumán Province.

Bibliography
 

1834 books
Books by Juan Bautista Alberdi